Pieter Gerritsz van Roestraten (21 April 1630 – 10 July 1700) was a Dutch  painter of still lifes, in particular floral and vanitas still lifes. He also painted genre scenes and portraits.  After starting his career in Haarlem, he worked most of his career in London where he enjoyed the patronage of the highest circles.

Life
He was a student of Frans Hals in Haarlem for at least five years starting from 1649.  He moved in 1651 to Amsterdam where he lived in the Anthonie Breestraat.  He married a daughter of Hals called Adriaentje in 1654. He lived with his wife in Amsterdam before moving to London in 1666.  The same year he was injured in the hip during the great fire of London, an injury that caused  him to walk with a limp the rest of his life.

He was likely introduced to king Charles II by Sir Peter Lely on the condition that he paint no portraits. Roestraten took the advice and stuck to still life painting. He was successful as he could earn forty to fifty pounds sterling for a still life. Van Roestraeten lived on the south side of King's Street.  This put him in close proximity to the Palace of Whitehall and to the studios of other artists, including Peter Lely and John Michael Wright. 

When his first wife died he remarried, but died soon afterwards.  He was buried on 10 July 1700 in St. Paul's Cathedral.

Work

Van Roestraten was principally a still life painter.  Most of his still lifes are pronkstillevens (i.e. ostentatious still lifes) and vanitas still lifes.  In his pronkstillevens he could display his ability to depict reflective surfaces of metal objects and, in particular, silver.  These paintings can to a certain extent be regarded as 'portraits' of the objects owned by his aristocratic patrons.  The various objects in these compositions serve as symbols that can be read as an admonition or a life lesson. The objects usually imply a vanitas meaning as they refer to the transience and emptiness of wealth and possessions and the ultimate extinction and emptiness of earthly life. An example is the Vanitas still life at the Royal Collection Trust.  It includes several objects that invoke the vanitas meaning: a skull, a glass orb and a pocket watch. The book is open at a print of a laughing Democritus inscribed in Latin with lines which can be translated as: 'Everyone is sick from birth / vanity is ruining the world'. In the suspended glass sphere in the composition can be seen the reflection of a room and the figure of an artist looking towards the viewer, probably a self-portrait. Self-portraits have been identified in at least nine of van Roestraten's still lifes.

Van Rosetraten painted a number of self-portraits, four of which are preserved. These all show the artist holding objects that appear in his still lifes, including glassware, a clay pipe and a lemon. In one self-portrait he holds a very large wineglass, perhaps in reference to Bacchus or the sense of taste. It may be a reference to Annibale Carracci's Boy Drinking (Cleveland Museum of Art).

He also painted a number of genre scenes.  An example is The Dissolute Kitchen Maid (1665, Frans Halsmuseum). While it looks like a scene from daily life, it has a clear erotic meaning. The woman is acting in a shameless manner. A monkey, the symbol of wanton behaviour, leers up her dress. It is on a chain thus reminding us that man is a prisoner of his sinful desires. The picture conveys a moral message, reflected in the old man's raised finger: beware of sinful behaviour.

He influenced Christian Berentz and Robert Robinson.  Around 1990 Fred Meijer of the Netherlands Institute for Art History created the notname 'Pseudo-Roestraten' for an unknown artist to whom he attributed a large number of still lifes with books, documents and precious objects in a style somewhat related to that of Pieter van Roestraeten.

References

External links

1630 births
1700 deaths
Dutch Golden Age painters
Dutch male painters
Dutch still life painters
Dutch portrait painters
Dutch genre painters
Artists from Haarlem